Aldo Suurväli (born 17 May 1967) is an Estonian butterfly swimmer. He competed in two events at the 1992 Summer Olympics.

References

External links
 

1967 births
Living people
Estonian male butterfly swimmers
Olympic swimmers of Estonia
Swimmers at the 1992 Summer Olympics
Swimmers from Tallinn